Oracle Team USA 17 is an AC72 class catamaran of Oracle Team USA that successfully defended the 2013 America's Cup. The yacht was donated to the Mariners' Museum in Newport News, Virginia, where as of 2017 it is on display.

Career
Oracle Team USA 17 was launched on April 23, 2013. Oracle Team USA 17 won against Aotearoa of Emirates Team New Zealand by 9–8 in the 2013 America's Cup.

References

2010s sailing yachts
AC72 yachts
America's Cup defenders
Sailing yachts of the United States
2013 America's Cup
Oracle Team USA